Derbyshire Country Cricket Club in 1894 was the cricket season when the English club Derbyshire had been playing for twenty three years. Derbyshire's matches were re-accorded first class status in this season but they did not start to take part in the County Championship until the following season.

1894 season

The captains of the leading counties determined that in 1894 Derbyshire with Essex, Leicestershire and Warwickshire , should be given first-class status. The match results did not count in the County Championship until 1895, when Hampshire  was also admitted. Derbyshire played eleven first-class games including one against MCC. They played three other matches which were against Hampshire and the touring South Africans. 

Derbyshire won six of their first class matches and lost four with one drawn. The three other matches were two draws and a loss to Hampshire. Sydney Evershed was in his fourth season as captain. Several players played for other first-class teams, and so  the top scorer and wicket-taker in Derbyshire's first-class matches was George Davidson.

Most of the team had played for Derbyshire in the 1887 season or before and had continued playing during the interval. Those who had joined in the interval and made their first-class debuts were Charles Evans,  Samuel Malthouse, Daniel Bottom, stand -in wicket-keeper Frank Mycroft and  William Delacombe.  Those who made their Derbyshire debut in 1894 and played subsequently were Samuel Hill-Wood future MP, baronet and chairman of Arsenal, William Locker footballer and  George Marsden lawyer. In addition John Young colliery carpenter played two career first class matches and Albert Widdowson farm hand played one career first class match in the season.

Matches

Statistics

First Class batting averages

Wright, Chatterton, Davidson and Walker played for North against South, and Chatterton Davidson and Walker played for Players against Gents.  Chatterton Davidson and Storer played for MCC

(a) Figures adjusted for non Derbyshire matches

First Class bowling averages

(a) Figures adjusted for non Derbyshire matches

Wicket Keeper

William Storer Catches 17, Stumping 5
Storer also kept wicket for MCC taking three catches and three stumpings. Frank Mycroft was stand-in wicket-keeper for one match.

See also
Derbyshire County Cricket Club seasons
1894 English cricket season

References

1894 in English cricket
Derbyshire County Cricket Club seasons
English cricket seasons in the 19th century